Onyinye Chikezie is a retired Nigerian female sprinter who specialised in 100 metres. She won a gold medal in the 1990 African Championships in Cairo. Her personal best in 100 metres was 11.56. She also competed in the 1992 World Junior Championships in Athletics in Seoul in 100 metres, 200 metres and was part of Nigeria's 4×100 metres relay women's team, without progressing to the finals in any of these events.

International competitions

References

External links

Living people
Nigerian female sprinters
Universiade medalists in athletics (track and field)
Year of birth missing (living people)
Universiade bronze medalists for Nigeria
Medalists at the 1993 Summer Universiade
20th-century Nigerian women